Gambar Abdul oghlu Zulalov (1895 – 1976) was an Azerbaijani khananda and actor. He was awarded the title Honored Artist of the Azerbaijan SSR.

Biography
Gambar Zulalov was born in 1895 in Shusha. After the death of his father Abdul Zulalov in 1898, he and his brother Ali Zulalov were taken into the care of his uncle Bulbuljan. Gambar Zulalov started his career in 1917 in Shusha. He came to Baku in 1919 after singing in Shusha for a while and playing opera and operetta roles in amateur performances. In 1926-1975 he was a soloist of Azerbaijan State Academic Opera and Ballet Theater with short breaks, where he performed roles Majnun's father, pasha, Nadir in Uzeyir Hajibeyov's operas "Leyli and Majnun", "Asli and Kerem", "Koroghlu".

He retired with honor at the age of 80. Gambar Zulalov died in 1976 in Baku.

Awards
Honored Artist of the Azerbaijan SSR — 26 April 1958

Family tree

References

1895 births
1976 deaths
20th-century Azerbaijani male singers
Musicians from Shusha
Soviet singers
Honored Artists of the Azerbaijan SSR